Eliseu dos Santos (born 15 November 1976 in Telêmaco Borba) is a Paralympic boccia player of Brazil who competes in the BC4 category. He took up the sport in 2005. At the 2008 and 2012 Paralympics he won individual bronze medals and shared gold medals in pairs with Dirceu Pinto. At the 2016 Paralympics he won a silver medal in the mixed pairs.

References

External links

1976 births
Living people
Boccia players at the 2008 Summer Paralympics
Boccia players at the 2012 Summer Paralympics
Boccia players at the 2016 Summer Paralympics
Paralympic gold medalists for Brazil
Paralympic silver medalists for Brazil
Paralympic bronze medalists for Brazil
Paralympic boccia players of Brazil
People from Telêmaco Borba
Medalists at the 2008 Summer Paralympics
Medalists at the 2012 Summer Paralympics
Medalists at the 2016 Summer Paralympics
Paralympic medalists in boccia
Medalists at the 2015 Parapan American Games
Medalists at the 2019 Parapan American Games
Boccia players at the 2020 Summer Paralympics
Sportspeople from Paraná (state)
21st-century Brazilian people